The Best of Both Worlds is a musical with book and lyrics by Randy Weiner, music by Diedre Murray, and additional scenes by Diane Paulus, loosely based on William Shakespeare's A Winter's Tale.

Productions 
The show played off-Broadway at the Women's Project Theatre. Directed by Diane Paulus, it featured sets by Mark Wedland, costumes by Gabriel Berry, and lighting by Kevin Adams. This production played from December 2, 2004, to January 2, 2005.

The Best of Both Worlds also played at the American Repertory Theater in Cambridge, Massachusetts from November 21, 2009 to January 3, 2010.

References 
Best of Both Worlds. americanrepertorytheater.org
Rizzo, Frank. Best of Both Worlds. Variety. Dec 7, 2009.
Cambridge News. American Repertory Theater Presents Best of Both Worlds. American Towns.
Randy Weiner - complete guide to the Playwright, Plays, Theatres ....

External links 
The Best of Both Worlds at the Internet Off-Broadway Database

2005 musicals
Off-Broadway musicals